Nacht is the German and Dutch word for night. It may refer to:

 Die Nacht (film), a 1985 West German installation film by Hans-Jürgen Syberberg
 "Die Nacht" (Strauss), an 1885 art song composed by Richard Strauss
 "Come Back, My Love" (German: ""), a song by Anton Rubinstein
 NACHT domain, a conserved protein domain
 Nacht Faust, a character from Japanese manga series Black Clover

People 
 Michael Nacht (born 1942), United States government official
 Sacha Nacht (1901–1977), French psychiatrist and psychoanalyst
 Artur Nacht-Samborski (1898–1974), Polish avant-garde painter; see 
  (born 1939), Swiss journalist
 Maximilian Nacht (1881–1973), pseudonym of American anarchist Max Nomad

See also
 Night (disambiguation)